"Devilicious" is the first single from Nikki Webster's fourth studio album. The track was released digitally and physically on June 12, 2009. The single peaked at number 4 on the Australian ARIA Physical Singles Chart and at 12 on the ARIA Dance Chart.

Promotion
The song made numerous headlines through the media during April 2009 due to Nikki's much publicised comeback. She performed the track with four backup dancers on The Morning Show.

Music video
A video premiered in April 2009 on the Piller Records website. It features her in a warehouse (the Rozelle Tram Depot) dancing with others. The video was directed by Luke Eve and choreographed by William Forsythe. Dancers included Mashum Liberta and Heath Keating.

Track listing
CD single
"Devilicious" (Radio Mix) [Mike Rizzo Funk Generation Remix]
"Devilicious" (Rafelson Mix)

Charts

References

Nikki Webster songs
2009 singles
2009 songs